Tourism/Terrorism is an EP by the New York City-based punk rock band the So So Glos, released on October 21, 2008 on Green Owl Records. It is their second release overall, following their 2007 self-titled debut album. It won the "Best Punk Album" category at the 9th annual Independent Music Awards.

Track listing
	There's A War – 0:31
	My Block – 3:34	
	Throw Your Hands Up – 3:34	
	Isn't It A Shame – 3:28	
	Love Or Empire – 3:57	
	There's A War (Holiday Version) – 0:55	
	Execution – 3:04	
	Island Loops – 3:41	
	Underneath The Universe – 5:03

Personnel

The So So Glos
Matt Elkin
Alex Levine
Ryan Levine
Zach Staggers

Other
Andrew French – photography
Nathan James – mastering
Adam Reach – audio engineering, audio production
Spidey – mixing

References

2008 EPs
Punk rock EPs
EPs by American artists